72 Cygni is a star in the northern constellation of Cygnus, located 299 light years from the Sun and a member of the Hercules stream. It is visible to the naked eye as a faint, orange-hued star with an apparent visual magnitude of 4.87. 72 Cyg is moving closer to the Earth with a heliocentric radial velocity of −68 km/s.

It has 1.7 times the mass of the Sun but has expanded to 14 times the Sun's radius. The star is radiating 69 times the Sun's luminosity from its enlarged photosphere at an effective temperature of 4,640 K.

References

K-type giants
CN stars
Cygnus (constellation)
Durchmusterung objects
Cygni, 72
205512
106551
8255